Thomas Aloysius Dorgan (April 29, 1877 – May 2, 1929), also known as Tad Dorgan, was an American cartoonist who signed his drawings as Tad. He is known for his cartoon panel Indoor Sports and comic strip Judge Rummy, as well as the many English words and expressions he coined or popularized.

Early life
Dorgan was born in San Francisco on April 29, 1877. He was one of at least 11 children—six sons and five daughters – of Thomas J. and Anna Dorgan. His brother John L. "Ike" Dorgan (born April 1879) was publicity manager for the Madison Square Garden, and his brother Richard W. "Dick" Dorgan (born September 1892) was an illustrator and cartoonist.

Polytechnic High School teachers Rosey Murdoch and Maria Van Vieck recognized and encouraged Tad's talent as an artist. When Dorgan was a child, he lost several fingers of his right hand in an accident whose details are unclear; Cosmopolitan writer O. O. McIntyre — a friend of Dorgan's — wrote that when Dorgan "was eight, he was fooling around on a house-moving job and attempted to ride a shovel on a rope that was propelled by a big pulley. He turned his head for a second and his right hand was caught in a pulley, crushing off four fingers of that right hand, which was reduced to a thumb and a piece of knuckle." Henry Morton Robinson's description of the incident is largely the same, except that he said it took place when Dorgan was nine.

Other accounts of the incident exist, however: Westbrook Pegler — who was likewise a friend of Dorgan's — wrote that Dorgan had lost "the first two fingers and half of the palm of his right hand" in an incident with a buzzsaw. Comics historian John Adcock has noted that, although there were "dozens of different stories", only McIntyre's version was in accordance with the statement on Dorgan's draft card that he had "all fingers except thumb off of right hand".

After the amputation, Dorgan took up drawing for therapy. When he was 14 he joined the art staff of the San Francisco Bulletin.

Strips and panels

He created his first comic strip, Johnny Wise, for the San Francisco Chronicle in 1902. By 1905 he was working in New York City at the New York Journal as a sports writer and cartoonist. Jack Dempsey described him as "the greatest authority on boxing."

In addition to his work as a sports journalist, Dorgan did a  humor feature, "Daffydills." His dog cartoons, including Judge Rummy (1910-1922), evolved into the strip Silk Hat Harry's Divorce Suit. This was accompanied by a one-panel gag series called Indoor Sports which became his main feature, along with an occasional Outdoor Sports.

Slang
Dorgan is generally credited with either creating or popularizing such words and expressions as "dumbbell" (a stupid person); "for crying out loud" (an exclamation of astonishment); "cat's meow" and "cat's pajamas" (as superlatives); "applesauce" (nonsense); "cheaters" (eyeglasses); "skimmer" (a hat); "hard-boiled" (tough and unsentimental); "drugstore cowboy" (loafers or ladies' men); "nickel-nurser" (a miser); "as busy as a one-armed paperhanger" (overworked); and "Yes, we have no bananas," which was turned into a popular song.

In the New York Times obituary, he was bracketed with George Ade and Ring Lardner as a popularizer of "a new slang vernacular." His obituary also credited him as the originator of "Twenty-three, Skidoo," "solid ivory," "Dumb Dora," "finale hopper," "Benny" for hat, and "dogs'" for shoes. W. J. Funk, of the Funk and Wagnall's dictionary company, placed Dorgan at the top of the list of the ten "most fecund makers of American slang."

Dorgan was erroneously credited with coining the usage of the phrase "hot dog" in reference to sausage (see "Hot dog: Etymology").

Life in Great Neck

Tad Dorgan and his wife, Izole M., lived in a Great Neck, New York house valued at $75,000. They had no biological children, but they raised two Chinese children to adulthood. Dorgan retired from attending sporting events in the early 1920s because of poor health, and a heart ailment kept him at home for the last eight years of his life, but he continued to produce sports comics for Hearst until his death. He died in Great Neck of heart disease, hastened by pneumonia. Hearst newspapers announced his passing in front-page headlines and some of his cartoons were reprinted for a short time. Izole Dorgan, a writer before she married, was the vice-president of the National Doll and Toy Collectors Club. After Tad's death, she started a successful business manufacturing doll furniture.

Books

Dorgan's first book collection was Daffydills, published by Cupples & Leon in 1911. This was followed by several Indoor Sports collections.

Awards
Tad Dorgan was inducted into the International Boxing Hall of Fame in 2007 in the category of "Observer"; that is, print and media journalists, publishers, writers, historians, photographers, and artists.

References

Sources
McCrory, Amy. "Sport Cartoons in Context: TAD Dorgan and Multi-Genre Cartooning in Early Twentieth-Century Newspapers," American Periodicals: A Journal of History, Criticism, and Bibliography – Volume 18, Number 1, pp. 45–68. The Ohio State University Press, 2008.
Zwilling, Leonard. A TAD Lexicon. Etymology and Linguistic Principles: V.3, Rolla MO: G. Cohen, 1993.
 TAD IS DONE, SERIOUSLY - obituary by Westbrook Pegler; published in The Washington Post, May 3, 1929; archived at Allan Holtz's StrippersGuide

External links

 Lambiek Comiclopedia
 Tad's Bonehead Barry baseball strip (1909–10)

1877 births
1929 deaths
American cartoonists
Boxing commentators
American amputees